Chi Cassiopeiae (χ Cassiopeiae) is a solitary, yellow-hued star in the constellation Cassiopeia. It is visible to the naked eye with an apparent visual magnitude of +4.7. Based upon an annual parallax shift of 15.67 mas as seen from Earth, this system is located roughly 208 light years from the Sun. At that distance, the visual magnitude is diminished by an extinction of 0.18 due to interstellar dust.

With a stellar classification of G9 IIIb, it has the spectrum of an evolved, G-type giant star. It has an estimated age of a billion years and is a red clump star that it is generating energy through helium fusion at its core. The star has about double the mass of the Sun and has expanded to 11 times the Sun's radius. It is radiating 67.6 times the Sun's luminosity from its photosphere at an effective temperature of 4,746 K.

References

G-type giants
Horizontal-branch stars
Cassiopeiae, Chi
Cassiopeia (constellation)
BD+58 0260
Cassiopeiae, 39
009408
007294
0442